"Gypsies in the Palace" is a song written and performed by American popular music singer-songwriter Jimmy Buffett. It was first released on his 1985 album Last Mango in Paris and was his first of three charting singles off that album.  This song charted No. 56 on US Country.

Plot
The song concerns an apparently professional entertainer who leaves his home in the care of the unnamed narrator and another man nicknamed "Snake" while he goes to perform elsewhere.

Once the homeowner leaves, the two men notice all the food and liquor he has and decide that it will go to waste if it's not consumed. They shoot the lock off his liquor cabinet and invite numerous people to his house to party: have naked conga lines, throw people into his swimming pool, and partake in his commodities.

When the homeowner calls the house and reports that he's returning early, the two rush everyone out and clean up the mess left during the party. When the homeowner returns, the two men point out all the work they've done around his house in his absence, then offer to watch the house again if the opportunity arises again.

Live Performances and Radio Edits
When performing the song in concert, Buffett calls it "The scariest song you'll hear tonight." Its performance is often preceded by a pre-recorded voice intoning:
"In days of old, when knights were bold,
And journeyed from their castles,
Trusty men were left behind;
Knights needed not the hassles.
They helped themselves to pig and peach,
And drank from King's own chalice;
Oh, it was a stirring sight,
These gypsies in the palace."
To which Buffett adds "And some things never change.  Hit it, boys!"

Jimmy Buffett stated when he appeared on Jerry Jeff Walker's television show, that the song was based on true-life experience.

When released as a single, the song was trimmed for radio, excluding the dialogue introduction and other corners of the song for pacing purposes.

Chart performance

Notes

1985 songs
Jimmy Buffett songs
MCA Records singles
Songs written by Jimmy Buffett
Songs with lyrics by Will Jennings
Songs written by Glenn Frey
Song recordings produced by Tony Brown (record producer)